Pseudotropheus perspicax is a species of cichlid endemic to Lake Malawi where it is known from Deep Bay.  This species can reach a length of  TL.  It can also be found in the aquarium trade.

References

Endemic fauna of Malawi
Perspicax
Fish described in 1935
Taxonomy articles created by Polbot